The 2021 Saint Francis Red Flash football team represented Saint Francis University as a member of the Northeast Conference (NEC) in the 2021 NCAA Division I FCS football season. The Red Flash, led by 11th-year head coach Chris Villarrial, played their home games at DeGol Field.

Schedule

References

Saint Francis
Saint Francis Red Flash football seasons
Saint Francis Red Flash football